Kishcha (Dargwa: Кӏиша) is a rural locality (a selo) and the administrative centre of Kishchinsky Selsoviet, Dakhadayevsky District, Republic of Dagestan, Russia. The population was 3,030 as of 2010. There are 23 streets.

Geography
Kishcha is located 7 km northwest of Urkarakh (the district's administrative centre) by road. Meusisha and Kharbuk are the nearest rural localities.

Nationalities 
Dargins live there.

References 

Rural localities in Dakhadayevsky District